The Los Angeles Kings are a professional ice hockey team based in Los Angeles. They are members of the Pacific Division of the Western Conference in the National Hockey League (NHL). The club was founded in 1967 as one of the League's expansion teams.

The Kings have won numerous team and individual awards and honors. They won the Stanley Cup as the League champions in 2012 and again in 2014.

League awards

Team trophies
The Kings have won the Western (previously the Campbell) Conference three times, in 1992–93, 2011–12 and 2013–14. They won two Stanley Cup championships in 2011–12 and in 2013–14.

Individual trophies

All-Stars

NHL first and second team All-Stars
The NHL first and second team All-Stars are the top players at each position as voted on by the Professional Hockey Writers' Association.

NHL All-Rookie Team
The NHL All-Rookie Team consists of the top rookies at each position as voted on by the Professional Hockey Writers' Association.

All-Star Game selections
The National Hockey League All-Star Game is a mid-season exhibition game held annually between many of the top players of each season. Forty-four All-Star Games have been held since the Kings entered the League in 1967, with at least one player chosen to represent the Kings in each year. The All-Star Game has not been held in various years: 1979 and 1987 due to the 1979 Challenge Cup and Rendez-vous '87 series between the NHL and the Soviet national team, respectively; 1995, 2005 and 2013 as a result of labor stoppages; 2006, 2010 and 2014 due to the Winter Olympic Games; and 2021 as a result of the COVID-19 pandemic. Los Angeles has hosted three All-Star Games. The 33rd Game took place at The Forum while the 52nd Game and 62nd Game took place at Staples Center.

 Selected by fan vote
 Selected by Commissioner
 All-Star Game Most Valuable Player

All-Star Game replacement events

Career achievements

Hockey Hall of Fame
The following is a list of Los Angeles Kings who have been enshrined in the Hockey Hall of Fame.

Foster Hewitt Memorial Award
Two members of the Kings organization have been honored with the Foster Hewitt Memorial Award. The award is presented by the Hockey Hall of Fame to members of the radio and television industry who make outstanding contributions to their profession and the game of ice hockey during their broadcasting career.

Lester Patrick Trophy
The Lester Patrick Trophy has been presented by the National Hockey League and USA Hockey since 1966 to honor a recipient's contribution to ice hockey in the United States. This list includes all personnel who have ever been employed by the Los Angeles Kings in any capacity and have also received the Lester Patrick Trophy.

United States Hockey Hall of Fame

Retired numbers

The Los Angeles Kings have retired six numbers, including Wayne Gretzky's number which was also retired league-wide. The first jersey retired was #30 in honor of Rogie Vachon, who goaltended for the club from 1972 to 1978. In 1985 #16 belonging to Marcel Dionne was retired. Five years later in 1995 the Kings retired former teammate of Dionne, Dave Taylor's #18 after seventeen years with the team. Wayne Gretzky's #99 was retired by the league in 2000 and later by the Kings in 2002. The most recent number retired was #23, for Dustin Brown in 2023.

Kings Hall of Fame

Team awards

Ace Bailey Memorial Award
The Ace Bailey Memorial Award is given annually to the Kings most inspirational player as determined by Kings players. It is named for former Kings Director of Pro Scouting Garnet "Ace" Bailey who died when United Airlines Flight 175 crashed into the World Trade Center in New York City during the September 11 attacks. Dave Taylor and Matt Greene both won the award six times during their Kings career.

Bill Libby Memorial Award
The Bill Libby Memorial Award is given annually to the Kings player who was the team's most valuable player as determined by the local media. It is named for Bill Libby, a former Los Angeles sportswriter who died on June 16, 1984. Marcel Dionne won the award eight times during his Kings career.

Jim Fox Community Service
The Community Service award is determined by the Kings Care Foundation and given annually to the Kings player who "best exemplifies strong community outreach by actively working with local youth organizations and community groups to increase awareness and raise funds to support the Kings community signature initiatives – education, health-related causes and recreation."

Daryl Evans Youth Hockey Service
The Daryl Evans Youth Hockey Service award is determined by the Kings Hockey Development Department and given annually to the Kings player "determined to continue the club's efforts in growing the game of hockey in our area."

Defensive Player
The Defensive Player award is given annually to the Kings player, regardless of position, who most excels on the defensive end of the ice as determined by the local media. Mattias Norstrom won the award five times during his Kings career.

Leading Scorer
The Leading Scorer award is given annually to the Kings team leader in points scored. Anze Kopitar has led the team in scoring fourteen times.

Mark Bavis Memorial Award
The Mark Bavis Memorial Award is given annually to the member of the Kings organization that makes the greatest impact as a newcomer. It is named for former Kings Scout Mark Bavis who died when United Airlines Flight 175 crashed into the World Trade Center in New York City during the September 11 attacks.

Most Popular Player
The Most Popular Player award is given annually by the Kings Booster Club to the most popular Kings player.

Outstanding Defenseman
The Outstanding Defenseman award is given annually to the Kings most outstanding defenseman as determined by the local media. Drew Doughty has the most wins with 11.

Unsung Hero
The Unsung Hero award is given annually to the Kings player who contributed the most to the team without receiving proper recognition for his contributions as determined by Kings players.

Other awards

See also
List of National Hockey League awards

Notes

Shared with Theoren Fleury of the Calgary Flames.

References 

Award winners by National Hockey League team